The Christian Presbyterian Church of Chile was founded by Korean missionaries among Spanish-speaking people in Chile.

The official founding date is 1994. It has approximately 600-700 members and 12 congregations. No women ordination is available. The Christian Presbyterian Church adheres to the Apostles Creed, Nicene Creed, Heidelberg Catechism and the Westminster Confession of Faith.

References

Presbyterian denominations in South America